Saratovsky is a rural locality (a khutor) in Yelenovskoye Rural Settlement of Koshekhablsky District, Adygea, Russia. The population was 480 as of 2018. There are 30 streets.

Geography 
Saratovsky is located 16 km southeast of Krasnogvardeyskoye (the district's administrative centre) by road. Yelenovskoye is the nearest rural locality.

References 

Rural localities in Koshekhablsky District